Turbonilla iolausi is a species of sea snail, a marine gastropod mollusk in the family Pyramidellidae, the pyrams and their allies.

Description
The shell grows to a length of 4.2 mm.

Distribution
This marine species occurs in the following locations:
 Gulf of Mexico: Pliocene beds of North St. Petersburg, Florida, at depths to 46 m.

References

External links
 To Encyclopedia of Life
 To World Register of Marine Species

iolausi
Gastropods described in 1955